Theodorick Bland may refer to:

Theodorick Bland of Westover (1629–1671), Virginia colonial politician
Theodorick Bland (surveyor) (1663–1700), Virginia colonial surveyor
Theodorick Bland of Cawsons (1708–1784), Virginia colonial politician
Theodorick Bland (congressman) (1742–1790), American soldier and politician from Virginia
Theodorick Bland (judge) (1776–1846), American jurist and diplomat from Maryland